Cerne Abbas is a village and civil parish in the county of Dorset in southern England. It lies in the Dorset Council administrative area in the Cerne Valley in the Dorset Downs. Dorset County Council estimate that the population of the civil parish in 2013 was 820. In the 2011 census the population of the civil parish, combined with the small neighbouring parish of Up Cerne, was 784.

In 2008 it was voted Britain's "Most Desirable Village" by estate agent Savills. It is notable as the location of the Cerne Abbas Giant, a chalk figure of a giant naked man on a hillside.

History

The village of Cerne Abbas grew up around the great Benedictine abbey, Cerne Abbey, which was founded there in AD 987 (Abbas is Medieval Latin for "abbot"). The Domesday Book of 1086 recorded cultivated land for twenty ploughs, with twenty-six villeins and thirty-two bordars. The abbey dominated the area for more than 500 years. It was surrendered to Henry VIII in 1539 with the Dissolution of the Monasteries and was largely destroyed; a portion of the Abbot's Porch and Abbey guesthouse remain. St Augustine's Well, reputedly blessed by the saint, also remains. St Mary's Church, built by the abbey for the parish in the late 13th century, is in the heart of the parish and retains many original features.

In the centuries after the Dissolution, the village thrived as a small market town. Its wealth was partly generated by brewing, its underground water making it famous for the quality of its beer, which was sold as far away as London and was even exported to the Americas. At one time, Cerne Abbas had 14 public houses, serving visitors and a population of about 1,500. The availability of water power also gave rise to milling, tanning, silk weaving, glove and hat making and many other small industries.

The coming of the railways in the 19th century bypassed Cerne and the village went into decline. By 1906, the population had halved and many of the houses had fallen into disrepair. In 1919, the village was sold by the Pitt-Rivers estate, which had owned it. The village now has a local school, a post office, three remaining historic public houses, tearooms and a number of other shops.

In Buildings of England, Nikolaus Pevsner claims that the Abbey Farm House, which was rebuilt after a fire in the mid-1700s, was formerly the main gateway to the abbey. When rebuilt, the central window of the former gateway projection was given an unusual "Gothic Venetian" window.

Tourist attractions
 

Cerne Abbas attracts many tourists, who are drawn by the Cerne river, streets lined with historic stone houses, the Abbey, the Giant, and various events including a classical music festival. The church of St Mary is of 13th-century origin but was largely rebuilt in the 15th and early 16th centuries and partly reconstructed in the 17th century. Features of interest include the 17th-century pulpit and the great east window which probably came from the abbey.

Cerne Abbas Giant 

The best known attraction is the Cerne Abbas Giant, a 55-metre (180 ft) naked figure carved into the chalk hillside. The giant, owned by the National Trust, is thought to be an Iron Age fertility symbol but, as it is unlikely that the monks of Cerne Abbey would have tolerated such a figure, and with no records before the 17th century, this cannot be confirmed. Many scholars think that it was created in the mid-17th century, although there is evidence of Iron Age settlement on the downs nearby.

Events 
Each June, the Cerne Abbas Open Gardens can attract over a thousand visitors. Other events include horticultural shows, the annual village fete, the Cerne Abbas Music Festival, and the Wessex Morris Men often perform in the village on Bank Holidays. The four-day music festival began in 1990 and hosts classical artists of world renown.

Notable people
Joseph Clark (1834–1926), painter, was born in Cerne Abbas
Joseph Benwell Clark (1857–1938), artist, was born in Cerne Abbas and retired here

Literature
 Cerne Abbas features in Thomas Hardy's Wessex as "Abbots Cernel".
 School of the Night, a mystery by Judith Cook set in Elizabethan England, contains scenes set in Cerne Abbas, and mentions the Cerne Abbas Giant.
 Unconquered, a historical novel by Neil Swanson set in pre-Revolutionary England and America, describes Abigail Hale's upbringing in Cerne Abbas.
 In John Le Carré's A Murder of Quality, the murder occurs in "Carne Abbas" in "Dorsett".
 Australian authors Kate Forsythe and Kim Wilkins collaborated in 2017 on a book of short stories, The Silver Well, all set in Cerne Abbas. Each story is set in a different time in the village's history, with the book spanning AD 44 and 2017.

References

External links

 Independent newspaper article
 A day in the life of Cerne Abbas

Villages in Dorset
Sites of Special Scientific Interest in Dorset